Bali Beyglu (also Romanized as Bālī Beyglū; also known as Bālā Beyglū) is a village in Mulan Rural District, in the Central District of Kaleybar County, East Azerbaijan Province, Iran. At the 2006 census, its population was 82, in 14 families. The village is populated by the Kurdish Chalabianlu tribe.

References 

Populated places in Kaleybar County
Kurdish settlements in East Azerbaijan Province